Laurelwood District is an American Viticultural Area (AVA) located west of the city of Portland and lies entirely within the northern end of Willamette Valley AVA with the Chehalem Mountains AVA  covering its northern slopes including the towns of Cornelius, Scholls and Sherwood in Washington County. The district was established on May 13, 2020, by the Alcohol and Tobacco Tax and Trade Bureau (TTB). The distinguishing feature of the Laurelwood District is the predominance of the Laurelwood soil that predominates in the area. The district contains the highest concentration of the namesake soil in Oregon.

Terroir 
The northern boundary is adjacent to Tualatin Hills AVA, which was established at the same time and also noted for the Laurelwood soil consisting of exceptionally fine wind-blown loess deposited over ancient basalt.  Silt-sized sediment was formed by the accumulation of wind-blown dust and produced by the grinding down of basaltic and other volcanic rocks by glaciers during the last Ice Age. The soil sits atop a fractured basalt subsoil that provides quick drainage and produces deeply rooted vines.  The iron-rich Missoula Flood loess also contributes a flavor of the wines.

Wine Industry  
The district lies in the heart of Oregon's Pinot Noir producing zone.
TTB received the petition from Maria Ponzi, president of Ponzi Vineyards, Luisa Ponzi, winemaker of Ponzi Vineyards, and Kevin Johnson, winemaker of Dion Vineyards, on behalf of themselves and other local grape growers and vintners, proposing the establishment of the “Laurelwood” AVA.

References

External links 
  Laurelwood District Washington County Visitors Association
  TTB AVA Map

American Viticultural Areas
Oregon wine
Geography of Washington County, Oregon
Geography of Yamhill County, Oregon
2020 establishments in Oregon